The Story of Personal Electronics is an album by Personal Electronics, released on August 8, 1995 through LOHD. It is the only album Brad Laner released under the moniker. John Payne of the LA Weekly described the music as "nerve-racking", noting that "Laner’s getting more immersed in the newer music technology, while exploring the benefits of simplicity."

Track listing

Personnel 
Brad Laner – instruments, production

References 

1998 albums